Alessandro Giacomel (born 9 July 1998) is an Italian footballer who plays as a goalkeeper for  club Virtus Verona.

Club career
He made his Serie C debut for Virtus Verona on 26 September 2018 in a game against Pordenone.

On 29 July 2019, he moved to Virtus Verona on a permanent basis.

References

External links
 

1998 births
Living people
Sportspeople from Padua
Italian footballers
Association football goalkeepers
Serie C players
Empoli F.C. players
U.S. Città di Pontedera players
Virtus Verona players
Italy youth international footballers
Footballers from Veneto